Gift Magubane, professionally known as Maggz is a South African rapper known for his time with Cashtime Life when Hip Hop music was at its peak in South Africa, and for his guest appearances on Da L.E.S's "Heaven" and "Real Stuff" alongside AKA.

The rapper went on a music hiatus, and was facing legal charges that nearly landed him 15 years in prison because of Bongani Fassie.

References

External links 
 

Living people
People from Soweto
South African rappers
South African record producers
South African musicians
People from Gauteng
South African composers
South African songwriters
Sotho people
21st-century rappers
21st-century South African musicians
Year of birth missing (living people)